Me and Veronica is a 1992 American drama film directed by Don Scardino (in his feature directorial debut), written by Leslie Lyles, and starring Elizabeth McGovern, Patricia Wettig and Michael O'Keefe.

Plot

Cast
Elizabeth McGovern as Fanny
Patricia Wettig as Veronica
Michael O'Keefe as Michael
John Heard as Frankie
Will Hare as Red 
Robert Leeshock as Jimmy
Mike Starr as Vinnie

References

External links
 
 

1992 films
1992 directorial debut films
1992 drama films
1992 independent films
1990s American films
1990s English-language films
American drama films
American independent films
Films about dysfunctional families
Films about sisters
Films directed by Don Scardino
Films scored by David Mansfield
Films set in New Jersey